Altona railway station is located on the Werribee line in Victoria, Australia. It serves the south-western Melbourne suburb of Altona, and it opened on 1 December 1917 as Altona Beach. It was renamed Altona on 3 October 1938.

History

Altona originally opened as the terminus of the line from Newport. The railway to Altona was constructed by the Altona Bay Estate Company, a private land developer, and opened on 9 November 1888 to a station named Altona Beach, which was about a kilometre to the east of the current station. As a result of the collapse of the 1880s Land Boom, regular services to Altona Beach ceased after August 1890, and the Victorian Government declined the offer of the owners to gift it the line. In the 1890s, the company opened a brown coal mine near the terminus of the line and, in 1907, a siding was built in the same area to enable sand to be dispatched by rail. In 1910, the Altona Brown Coal Colliery Company began railing quantities of brown coal, using a siding which was a north-west extension of the Altona line.

In 1917, the owners of the railway entered into an agreement with the Victorian Railways (VR) to provide a regular passenger service, having guaranteed to cover any operating losses. On 1 December 1917, the VR opened a new Altona Beach station on the present site. For a period of time, de-motored McKeen railmotors were used as carriages on steam-hauled passenger services.

By 1924, the private owner of the Altona line owed the VR £7,289, being the accumulated deficit on operating passenger services, so the VR took full control of the line on 1 October of that year. In 1926, the track was electrified and, in 1938, the station was renamed Altona. Apart from a few direct trains between Altona and Melbourne in peak periods, all trains were run as shuttle services between Newport and Altona.

On 31 July 1959, the station was closed to goods traffic and, in 1967, flashing light signals were provided at the Pier Street level crossing, located at the Up end of the station. In 1977, the platform was extended at the Down end.

By the early 1980s, the station, and the line itself, was under threat of closure, as recommended in the Lonie Report. In October 1981, the rail service was drastically cut, with all shuttle services withdrawn, and only two morning and evening trains being operated to and from Melbourne. However, a change of state government in 1982 saw the restitution of many services in July of that year. On 21 January 1985, the line was subsequently extended to Westona and, on 14 April of that year, was extended from Westona to Laverton. Also in that year, boom barriers were provided at the Pier Street level crossing.

Platforms and services

Altona has one platform. It is served by Werribee line trains.

Platform 1:
  all stations services to Flinders Street and Frankston; all station services to Laverton (weekdays only) and Werribee

Transport links

CDC Melbourne operates three routes via Altona station, under contract to Public Transport Victoria:
 : Laverton station – Footscray
 : Laverton station – Footscray
 : Laverton station – Williamstown

Kinetic Melbourne operates one SmartBus route to and from Altona station, under contract to Public Transport Victoria:
  : to Mordialloc

References

External links
 Melway map at street-directory.com.au

Railway stations in Melbourne
Railway stations in Australia opened in 1917
Railway stations in the City of Hobsons Bay